The United Fruit Company (now Chiquita) was an American multinational corporation that traded in tropical fruit (primarily bananas) grown on Latin American plantations and sold in the United States and Europe. The company was formed in 1899 from the merger of the Boston Fruit Company with Minor C. Keith's banana-trading enterprises. It flourished in the early and mid-20th century, and it came to control vast territories and transportation networks in Central America, the Caribbean coast of Colombia and the West Indies. Although it competed with the Standard Fruit Company (later Dole Food Company) for dominance in the international banana trade, it maintained a virtual monopoly in certain regions, some of which came to be called banana republics – such as Costa Rica, Honduras, and Guatemala.

United Fruit had a deep and long-lasting impact on the economic and political development of several Latin American countries. Critics often accused it of exploitative neocolonialism, and they described it as the archetypal example of the influence of a multinational corporation on the internal politics of the so-called banana republics. After a period of financial decline, United Fruit merged with Eli M. Black's AMK in 1970 to become the United Brands Company. In 1984, Carl Lindner, Jr. transformed United Brands into the present-day Chiquita Brands International.

Corporate history

Early years
In 1871, U.S. railroad entrepreneur Henry Meiggs signed a contract with the government of Costa Rica to build a railroad connecting the capital city of San José to the port of Limón in the Caribbean. Meiggs was assisted in the project by his young nephew, Minor C. Keith, who took over Meiggs's business concerns in Costa Rica after his death in 1877. Keith began experimenting with the planting of bananas as a cheap source of food for his workers.

When the Costa Rican government defaulted on its payments in 1882, Keith had to borrow £1.2 million from London banks and from private investors to continue the difficult engineering project. In exchange for this and for renegotiating Costa Rica's own debt, in 1884, the administration of President Próspero Fernández Oreamuno agreed to give Keith  of tax-free land along the railroad, plus a 99-year lease on the operation of the train route. The railroad was completed in 1890, but the flow of passengers proved insufficient to finance Keith's debt. However, the sale of bananas grown in his lands and transported first by train to Limón, then by ship to the United States, proved very lucrative. Keith eventually came to dominate the banana trade in Central America and along the Caribbean coast of Colombia.

United Fruit (1899–1970)

In 1899, Keith lost $1.5 million when Hoadley and Co., a New York City broker, went bankrupt. He then traveled to Boston, Massachusetts, to participate in the merger of his banana trading company, Tropical Trading and Transport Company, with the rival Boston Fruit Company. Boston Fruit had been established by Lorenzo Dow Baker, a sailor who, in 1870, had bought his first bananas in Jamaica, and by Andrew W. Preston. Preston's lawyer, Bradley Palmer, had devised a scheme for the solution of the participants' cash flow problems and was in the process of implementing it. 
The merger formed the United Fruit Company, based in Boston, with Preston as president and Keith as vice-president. Palmer became a permanent member of the executive committee and for long periods of time the director. From a business point of view, Bradley Palmer was United Fruit. Preston brought to the partnership his plantations in the West Indies, a fleet of steamships, and his market in the U.S. Northeast. Keith brought his plantations and railroads in Central America and his market in the U.S. South and Southeast. At its founding, United Fruit was capitalized at $11.23 million. The company at Palmer's direction proceeded to buy, or buy a share in, 14 competitors, assuring them of 80% of the banana import business in the United States, then their main source of income. The company catapulted into financial success. Bradley Palmer overnight became a much-sought-after expert in business law, as well as a wealthy man. He later became a consultant to presidents and an adviser to Congress.

In 1900, the United Fruit Company produced The Golden Caribbean: A Winter Visit to the Republics of Colombia, Costa Rica, Spanish Honduras, Belize and the Spanish Main – via Boston and New Orleans written and illustrated by Henry R. Blaney. The travel book featured landscapes and portraits of the inhabitants pertaining to the regions where the United Fruit Company possessed land. It also described the voyage of the United Fruit Company's steamer, and Blaney's descriptions and encounters of his travels.

In 1901, the government of Guatemala hired the United Fruit Company to manage the country's postal service, and in 1913 the United Fruit Company created the Tropical Radio and Telegraph Company. By 1930, it had absorbed more than 20 rival firms, acquiring a capital of $215 million and becoming the largest employer in Central America. In 1930, Sam Zemurray (nicknamed "Sam the Banana Man") sold his Cuyamel Fruit Company to United Fruit and retired from the fruit business. By then, the company held a major role in the national economies of several countries and eventually became a symbol of the exploitative export economy. This led to serious labor disputes by the Costa Rican peasants, involving more than 30 separate unions and 100,000 workers, in the 1934 Great Banana Strike, one of the most significant actions of the era by trade unions in Costa Rica.

By the 1930s the company owned  of land in Central America and the Caribbean and was the single largest land owner in Guatemala. Such holdings gave it great power over the governments of small countries. That was one of the factors that led to the coining of the phrase "banana republic".

In 1933, concerned that the company was mismanaged and that its market value had plunged, Zemurray staged a hostile takeover. Zemurray moved the company's headquarters to New Orleans, Louisiana, where he was based. United Fruit went on to prosper under Zemurray's management; Zemurray resigned as president of the company in 1951.

In addition to many other labor actions, the company faced two major strikes of workers in South and Central America, in Colombia in 1928 and the Great Banana Strike of 1934 in Costa Rica. The latter was an important step that would eventually lead to the formation of effective trade unions in Costa Rica since the company was required to sign a collective agreement with its workers in 1938. Labor laws in most banana production countries began to be tightened in the 1930s. United Fruit Company saw itself as being specifically targeted by the reforms, and often refused to negotiate with strikers, despite frequently being in violation of the new laws.

In 1952, the government of Guatemala began expropriating unused United Fruit Company land to landless peasants. The company responded by intensively lobbying the U.S. government to intervene and mounting a misinformation campaign to portray the Guatemalan government as communist. In 1954, the U.S. Central Intelligence Agency deposed the democratically elected government of Guatemala, and installed a pro-business military dictatorship.

In 1967, it acquired the A&W Restaurants.

United Brands (1970–1984)
Corporate raider Eli M. Black bought 733,000 shares of United Fruit in 1968, becoming the company's largest shareholder. In June 1970, Black merged United Fruit with his own public company, AMK (owner of meat packer John Morrell), to create the United Brands Company. United Fruit had far less cash than Black had counted on, and Black's mismanagement led to United Brands becoming crippled with debt. The company's losses were exacerbated by Hurricane Fifi in 1974, which destroyed many banana plantations in Honduras. On February 3, 1975, Black committed suicide by jumping out of his office on the 44th floor of the Pan Am Building in New York City. Later that year, the U.S. Securities and Exchange Commission exposed a scheme by United Brands (dubbed Bananagate) to bribe Honduran President Oswaldo López Arellano with $1.25 million, plus the promise of another $1.25 million upon the reduction of certain export taxes. Trading in United Brands stock was halted, and López was ousted in a military coup.

Chiquita Brands International

After Black's suicide, Cincinnati-based American Financial Group, one of billionaire Carl Lindner, Jr.'s companies, bought into United Brands. In August 1984, Lindner took control of the company and renamed it Chiquita Brands International. The headquarters was moved to Cincinnati in 1985. By 2019, the company's main offices left the United States and relocated to Switzerland.

Throughout most of its history, United Fruit's main competitor was the Standard Fruit Company, now the Dole Food Company.

Reputation
The United Fruit Company is well known for bribing government officials in exchange for preferential treatment, exploiting its workers, paying little by way of taxes to the governments of the countries where it operated, and working ruthlessly to consolidate monopolies. Latin American journalists sometimes referred to the company as el pulpo ("the octopus"), and leftist parties in Latin America encouraged the company's workers to strike. Criticism of the United Fruit Company became a staple of the discourse of the communist parties in several Latin American countries, where its activities were often interpreted as illustrating Vladimir Lenin's theory of capitalist imperialism. Major left-wing writers in Latin America, such as Carlos Luis Fallas of Costa Rica, Ramón Amaya Amador of Honduras, Miguel Ángel Asturias and Augusto Monterroso of Guatemala, Gabriel García Márquez of Colombia, Carmen Lyra of Costa Rica, and Pablo Neruda of Chile, denounced the company in their literature.

The business practices of United Fruit were also frequently criticized by journalists, politicians, and artists in the United States. Little Steven released a song in 1987 called "Bitter Fruit", with lyrics that referred to a hard life for a company "far away," and whose accompanying video depicted orange groves worked by peasants overseen by wealthy managers. The lyrics and scenery are generic, but United Fruit (or its successor Chiquita) was reputedly the target.

The integrity of John Foster Dulles' "anti-Communist" motives has been disputed, since Dulles and his law firm of Sullivan & Cromwell negotiated the land giveaways to the United Fruit Company in Guatemala and Honduras. John Foster Dulles' brother, Allen Dulles, who was head of the CIA under Eisenhower, also did legal work for United Fruit. The Dulles brothers and Sullivan & Cromwell were on the United Fruit payroll for thirty-eight years. Recent research has uncovered the names of multiple other government officials who received benefits from United Fruit:

History in Latin America
The United Fruit Company (UFCO) owned huge tracts of land in the Caribbean lowlands. It also dominated regional transportation networks through its International Railways of Central America and its Great White Fleet of steamships. In addition, UFCO branched out in 1913 by creating the Tropical Radio and Telegraph Company. UFCO's policies of acquiring tax breaks and other benefits from host governments led to it building enclave economies in the regions, in which a company's investment is largely self-contained for its employees and overseas investors and the benefits of the export earnings are not shared with the host country.

One of the company's primary tactics for maintaining market dominance was to control the distribution of arable land. UFCO claimed that hurricanes, blight and other natural threats required them to hold extra land or reserve land. In practice, what this meant was that UFCO was able to prevent the government from distributing land to peasants who wanted a share of the banana trade. The fact that the UFCO relied so heavily on manipulating land use rights to maintain their market dominance had a number of long-term consequences for the region. For the company to maintain its unequal land holdings it often required government concessions. And this in turn meant that the company had to be politically involved in the region even though it was an American company. In fact, the heavy-handed involvement of the company in often-corrupt governments created the term "banana republic", which represents a servile dictatorship. The term "Banana Republic" was coined by American writer O. Henry.

Environmental effects
The United Fruit Company's entire process of creating a plantation to farming the banana and the effects of these practices created noticeable environmental degradation when it was a thriving company. Infrastructure built by the company was constructed by clearing out forests, filling in low, swampy areas, and installing sewage, drainage, and water systems. Ecosystems that existed on these lands were destroyed, devastating biodiversity. With a loss in biodiversity, other natural processes within nature necessary for plant and animal survival are shut down.

Techniques used for farming were at fault for loss of biodiversity and harm to the land as well. To create farm land, the United Fruit Company would either clear forests (as mentioned) or would drain marshlands to reduce avian habitats and to create "good" soil for banana plant growth. The most common practice in farming was called the "shifting plantation agriculture". This is done by using produced soil fertility and hydrological resources in the most intense manner, then relocating when yields fell and pathogens followed banana plants. Techniques like this destroy land and when the land is unusable for the company, then they move to other regions.

Guatemala

Although UFCO sometimes promoted the development of the nations where it operated, its long-term effects on their economy and infrastructure were often devastating. In Central America, the Company built extensive railroads and ports, provided employment and transportation, and created numerous schools for the people who lived and worked on Company land. On the other hand, it allowed vast tracts of land under its ownership to remain uncultivated and, in Guatemala and elsewhere, it discouraged the government from building highways, which would have lessened the profitable transportation monopoly of the railroads under its control. UFCO also destroyed at least one of those railroads upon leaving its area of operation.

In 1954, the Guatemalan government of Colonel Jacobo Árbenz, elected in 1950, was toppled by forces led by Colonel Carlos Castillo Armas who invaded from Honduras. Commissioned by the Eisenhower administration, this military operation was armed, trained and organized by the U.S. Central Intelligence Agency (see Operation PBSuccess). The directors of United Fruit Company (UFCO) had lobbied to convince the Truman and Eisenhower administrations that Colonel Árbenz intended to align Guatemala with the Eastern Bloc. Besides the disputed issue of Árbenz's allegiance to communism, UFCO was being threatened by the Árbenz government's agrarian reform legislation and new Labor Code. UFCO was the largest Guatemalan landowner and employer, and the Árbenz government's land reform program included the expropriation of 40% of UFCO land. U.S. officials had little proof to back their claims of a growing communist threat in Guatemala; however, the relationship between the Eisenhower administration and UFCO demonstrated the influence of corporate interest on U.S. foreign policy. United States Secretary of State John Foster Dulles, an avowed opponent of communism, was also a member of the law firm, Sullivan and Cromwell, which had represented United Fruit. His brother Allen Dulles, director of the CIA, was also a board member of United Fruit. United Fruit Company is the only company known to have a CIA cryptonym. The brother of the Assistant Secretary of State for InterAmerican Affairs, John Moors Cabot, had once been president of United Fruit. Ed Whitman, who was United Fruit's principal lobbyist, was married to President Eisenhower's personal secretary, Ann C. Whitman. Many individuals who directly influenced U.S. policy towards Guatemala in the 1950s also had direct ties to UFCO.

After the overthrow of Árbenz, a military dictatorship was established under Carlos Castillo Armas. Soon after coming to power, the new government launched a concerted campaign against trade unionists, in which some of the most severe violence was directed at workers on the plantations of the United Fruit Company.

Despite UFCO's government connections and conflicts of interest, the overthrow of Árbenz failed to benefit the company. Its stock market value declined along with its profit margin. The Eisenhower administration proceeded with antitrust action against the company, which forced it to divest in 1958. In 1972, the company sold off the last of its Guatemalan holdings after over a decade of decline.

Even as the Árbenz government was being overthrown, in 1954 a general strike against the company organized by workers in Honduras rapidly paralyzed that country, and, due to the United States' concern about the events in Guatemala, was settled more favorably for the workers in order for the United States to gain leverage for the Guatemala operation.

Cuba
Company holdings in Cuba, which included sugar mills in the Oriente region of the island, were expropriated by the 1959 revolutionary government led by Fidel Castro. By April 1960 Castro was accusing the company of aiding Cuban exiles and supporters of former leader Fulgencio Batista in initiating a seaborne invasion of Cuba directed from the United States. Castro warned the U.S. that "Cuba is not another Guatemala" in one of many combative diplomatic exchanges before the U.S. organized the failed Bay of Pigs Invasion of 1961.

Banana massacre

One of the most notorious strikes by United Fruit workers broke out on 12 November 1928 near Santa Marta on the Caribbean coast of Colombia. On December 6, Colombian Army troops allegedly under the command of General Cortés Vargas opened fire on a crowd of strikers in the central square of Ciénaga. Estimates of the number of casualties vary from 47 to 3,000. The military justified this action by claiming that the strike was subversive and its organizers were Communist revolutionaries. Congressman Jorge Eliécer Gaitán claimed that the army had acted under instructions from the United Fruit Company. The ensuing scandal contributed to President Miguel Abadía Méndez's Conservative Party being voted out of office in 1930, putting an end to 44 years of Conservative rule in Colombia. The first novel of Álvaro Cepeda Samudio, La Casa Grande, focuses on this event, and the author himself grew up in close proximity to the incident. The climax of García Márquez's novel One Hundred Years of Solitude is based on the events in Ciénaga.

General Cortés Vargas issued the order to shoot, arguing later that he had done so because of information that US boats were poised to land troops on Colombian coasts to defend American personnel and the interests of the United Fruit Company. Vargas issued the order so the United States would not invade Colombia.

The telegram from Bogotá Embassy to the U.S. Secretary of State, dated December 5, 1928, stated:

The telegram from Bogotá Embassy to Secretary of State, date December 7, 1928, stated:

The dispatch from U.S. Bogotá Embassy to the U.S. Secretary of State, dated December 29, 1928, stated:

The dispatch from the U.S. embassy to the U.S. Secretary of State, dated January 16, 1929, stated:

The Banana massacre is said to be one of the main events that preceded the Bogotazo, the subsequent era of violence known as La Violencia, and the guerrillas who developed in the bipartisan National Front period, creating the ongoing armed conflict in Colombia.

The United Fruit Company in Honduras

Attempt at state capture

Following the Honduran declaration of independence in 1838 from the Central American Federation, Honduras was in a state of economic and political strife due to constant conflict with neighboring countries for territorial expansion and control. Liberal President Marco Aurelio Soto (1876–1883) saw instating the Agrarian Law of 1877 as a way to make Honduras more appealing to international companies looking to invest capital into a promising host export-driven economy. The Agrarian Law would grant international, multinational companies leniency in tax regulations along with other financial incentives. Acquiring the first railroad concession from liberal President Miguel R. Dávila in 1910, the Vaccaro brothers and Company helped set the foundation on which the banana republic would struggle to balance and regulate the relationships between American capitalism and Honduran politics.

Samuel Zemurray, a small-sized American banana entrepreneur, rose to be another contender looking to invest in the Honduran agricultural trade. In New Orleans, Zemurray found himself strategizing with the newly exiled General Manuel Bonilla (nationalist ex-president of Honduras 1903–1907, 1912–1913) and fomented a coup d'état against President Dávila. On Christmas Eve, December 1910, in clear opposition of the Dávila administration, Samuel Zemurray, U.S. General Lee Christmas, and Honduran General Manuel Bonilla boarded the yacht "Hornet", formerly known as the USS Hornet and recently purchased by Zemurray in New Orleans. With a gang of New Orleans mercenaries and plenty of arms and ammunition, they sailed to Roatan to attack, then seize the northern Honduran ports of Trujillo and La Ceiba. Unbeknownst to Zemurray, he was being watched by the US Secret Service. Having captured the aging fort at Roatan, he quickly sold the Hornet to a Honduran straw buyer on the island to avoid falling foul of the Neutrality Act. After successfully attacking the port of Trujillo, the Hornet unexpectedly encountered the U.S. gunboat Tacoma, and was towed back to New Orleans. The nascent revolution continued apace, Zemurray's media contacts having spread the word in advance. President Dávila was forced to step down, with Francisco Bertrand becoming interim president until General Bonilla handily won the November 1911 Honduran presidential elections.

In 1912, General Bonilla quickly granted the second railroad concession to the newly incorporated Cuyamel Fruit Company owned by Zemurray. The period of some of these exclusive railroad land concessions was up to 99 years. The first railroad concession leased the national railroad of Honduras to the Vaccaro Bros. and Co. (once Standard Fruit Company and currently Dole Food Company). Zemurray granted his concession to the Tela Railroad Company—another division within his own company. Cuyamel Fruit Company's concession would also be awarded to the Tela Railroad Company. United Fruit Company (currently Chiquita Brands International) would partner with President Bonilla in the exchange of access and control of Honduran natural resources plus tax and financial incentives. In return, President Bonilla would receive cooperation, protection and a substantial amount of U.S. capital to build a progressive infrastructure in Honduras.

Banana multinational establishment and expansion

The granting of land ownership in exchange for the railroad concession started the first official competitive market for bananas and giving birth to the banana republic. Cuyamel Fruit Company and the Vaccaro Bros. and Co. would become known as being multinational enterprises. Bringing western modernization and industrialization to the welcoming Honduran nation. All the while Honduran bureaucrats would continue to take away the indigenous communal lands to trade for capital investment contracts as well as neglect the fair rights of Honduran laborers. After the peak of the banana republic era, resistance eventually began to grown on the part of small-scale producers and production laborers, due to the exponential rate in growth of the wealth gap as well as the collusion between the profiting Honduran government officials and the U.S. fruit companies (United Fruit Co., Standard Fruit Co., Cuyamel Fruit Co.) versus the Honduran working and poor classes.

Due to the exclusivity of the land concessions and lack of official ownership documentation, Honduran producers and experienced laborers were left with two options to regain these lands—dominio util or dominio pleno. Dominio util—meaning the land was intended to be developed for the greater good of the public with a possibility of being the granted "full private ownership" versus dominio pleno was the immediate granting of full private ownership with the right to sell. Based on the 1898 Honduran agrarian law, without being sanctioned the right their communal lands, Honduran villages and towns could only regain these lands if granted by the Honduran government or in some cases it was permitted by U.S. companies, such as United Fruit Co., to create long-term contracts with independent producers on devastatingly diseased infested districts. Even once granted land concessions, many were so severely contaminated with either the Panaman, moko, or sigatoka, that it would have to reduce the acreage used and the amount produced or changed the crop being produced. Additionally, accusations were reported of the Tela Railroad Company placing intense requirements, demanding exclusivity in distribution, and unjustly denying crops produced by small-scale farmers because they were deemed "inadequate". Compromise was attempted between small-scale fruit producers and the multinationals enterprises, but were never reached and resulted in local resistance.

The U.S. fruit corporations were choosing rural agriculture lands in Northern Honduras, specifically using the new railroad system for their proximity to major port cities of Puerto Cortes, Tela, La Ceiba, and Trujillo as the main access points of transport for shipments designated back to the United States and Europe. To get an understanding of the dramatic increase in amount of bananas being exported, firstly "in the Atlantida, the Vaccaro Brothers (Standard Fruit) oversaw the construction of 155 kilometers of railroad between 1910 and 1915...the expansion of the railroad led to a concomitant rise exports, from 2.7 million bunches in 1913 to 5.5 million in 1919." Standard Fruit, Cuyamel, and the United Fruit Co. combined surpassed past profit performances, "In 1929 a record 29 million bunches left Honduran shores, a volume that exceeded the combined exports of Colombia, Costa Rica, Guatemala, and Panama."

Social welfare programs for employees of United Fruit Company
U.S. food corporations, such as United Fruit established community services and facilitates for mass headquartered (production) divisions, settlements of banana plantations throughout their partnered host countries such in the Honduran cities of Puerto Cortes, El Progreso, La Ceiba, San Pedro Sula, Tela, and Trujillo.) Because of the strong likelihood of these communities being in extremely isolated rural agricultural areas, both American and Honduran workers were offered on-site community services similar to those found in other company towns, such as free, furnished housing (similar to barracks) for workers and their immediate family members, health care via hospitals/clinics/health units, education (2–6 years) for children/younger dependents/ other laborers, commissaries (grocery/retail), religious (United Fruit built on-site churches) and social activities, agricultural training at the Zamorano Pan-American Agricultural School, and cultural contributions such as the restoration of the Mayan city Zaculeu in Guatemala.

According to a 2022 study in Econometrica, the UFCo had a positive and persistent effect on living standards in Costa Rica, which had granted substantial land concessions to the company from 1899 to 1984. The reason is that the company invested heavily in local amenities, such as education and health care, in order to attract and maintain a sizable workforce.

Agriculture research and training

Samuel Zemurray employed agronomists, botanists, and horticulturists to aid in research studies for United Fruit in their time of crisis, as early as 1915 when the Panama disease first inhabited crops. Funding specialized studies to treat Panama disease and supporting the publishing of such findings throughout the 1920s–1930s, Zemurray has consistently been an advocate for agricultural research and education. This was first observed when Zemurray funded the first research station of Lancetilla in Tela, Honduras in 1926 and led by Dr. Wilson Popenoe.

Zemurray also founded the Zamorano Pan-American Agricultural School (Escuela Agricola Panamericana) in 1941 with Dr. Popenoe as the head agronomist. There were certain requirements before a student could be accepted into the fully paid for 3-year program including additional expenses (room and board, clothing, food, stc), a few being a male between the ages of 18–21, 6 years of elementary education, plus an additional 2 years of secondary. Zemurray, established a policy where, "The School is not for the training or improvement of the company's own personnel, but represents an outright and disinterested contribution to the improvement of agriculture in Spanish America...This was one way in which the United Fruit Company undertook to discharge its obligation of social responsibility in those countries in which it operates-and even to help others." Zemurray was so intensely adamant in his policy, that students were not allowed to become employees at the United Fruit Company post graduation.

United fruit and labor challenges

Invasive banana diseases
Epidemic diseases would cyclically strike the banana enterprise in the form of Panama disease, black sigatoka, and Moko (Ralstonia solanacearum). Large investments of capital, resources, time, tactical practices, and extensive research would be necessary in search for a solution. The agriculture research facilities employed by United Fruit pioneered in the field of treatment with physical solutions such as controlling Panama disease via "flood fallowing" and chemical formulations such as the Bordeaux mixture spray.

These forms of treatment and control would be rigorously applied by laborers on a daily basis and for long periods of time so that they would be as effective as possible. Potentially toxic chemicals were constantly exposed to workers such as copper(II) sulfate in Bordeaux spray (which is still used intensively today in organic and "bio" agriculture), 1,2-dibromo-3-chloropropane in Nemagon the treatment for Moko, or the sigatoka control process that began a chemical spray followed by an acid wash of bananas post-harvesting. The fungicidal treatments would cause workers to inhale fungicidal dust and come into direct skin contact with the chemicals without means of decontamination until the end of their workday. These chemicals would be studied and proven to carry their own negative repercussions towards the laborers and land of these host nations.

While the Panama disease was the first major challenging and aggressive epidemic, again United Fruit would be faced with an even more combative fungal disease, Black sigatoka, in 1935. Within a year, sigatoka plagued 80% of their Honduran crop and once again scientists would begin a search for a solution to this new epidemic. By the end of 1937 production resumed to its normal level for United Fruit after the application of Bordeaux spray, but not without creating devastating blows to the banana production. "Between 1936–1937, the Tela Railroad Company banana output fell from 5.8 to 3.7 million bunches" and this did not include independent farmers who also suffered from the same epidemics, "export figures confirm the devastating effect of the pathogen on non-company growers: between 1937-1939 their exports plummeted from 1.7 million bunches to a mere 122,000 bunches". Without any positive eradication of sigatoka from banana farms due to the tropical environment, the permanent fungicidal treatment was incorporated and promoted in every major banana enterprise, which would be reflective in the time, resources, labor, and allocation of expenses needed for rehabilitation.

Labor health risks
Both United Fruit Company production laborers and their fellow railroad workers from the Tela Railroad Company were not only at constant risk from long periods of chemical exposure in the intense tropical environment, but there was a possibility of contracting malaria/ yellow fever from mosquito bites, or inhale the airborne bacteria of tuberculosis from infected victims.

In 1950, El Prision Verde ("The Green Prison"), written by Ramón Amaya Amador, a leading member of the Honduran Communist Party, exposed the injustices of working and living conditions on banana plantations with the story of Martin Samayoa, a former Bordeaux spray applicator. This literary piece is the personal account of everyday life, as an applicator, and the experienced as well as witnessed injustices pre/post-exposure to the toxic chemicals within these fungicidal treatments and insecticides. The Bordeaux spray in particular is a blue-green color and many sources referring to its usage usually bring to light the apparent identification of those susceptible to copper toxicity based on their appearance after working. For example, Pericos ("parakeets") was the nickname given to spray workers in Puerto Rico because of the blue-green coloring left on their clothing after a full day of spraying. In 1969, there was only one documented case of vineyard workers being studied in Portugal as they worked with the Bordeaux spray whom all suffered similar health symptoms and biopsied to find blue-green residue within the victim's lungs.

Little evidence was collected in the 1930s–1960s by either the American or Honduran officials to address these acute, chronic, and deadly effects and illnesses warranted from the chemical exposure such as tuberculosis, long-term respiratory problems, weight loss, infertility, cancer, and death. Many laborers were discouraged to voice the pain caused from physical injustices that occurred from the chemicals penetrating their skin or by inhalation from fungicide fumes in long labor-intensive hours spraying the applications. Without any specialized health care targeted to cure these unabating ailments and little to no compensation of workers who did become gravely ill. Bringing awareness to such matters especially against major powers such as United Fruit Co. amongst other multinational companies and the involved national governments would be feat for any single man/ woman to prove and demand for change. That is until the legalization of labor unionization and organized resistance.

Resistance and reformation
Labor resistance, although was most progressive in the 1950s to the 1960s, there has been a consistent presence of abrasiveness towards multinational enterprises such as United Fruit. General Bonilla's choice to approve the concessions without demanding the establishment of fair labor rights and market price, nor enforce a comprise between small-scale fruit producers and the conglomerate of U.S. fruit enterprises would create the foundation in which strife would ensue from political, economic, and natural challenges. The first push for resistance began from the labor movement, leading into the Honduran government's turn towards nationalism, compliance with Honduran land and labor reformations (1954–1974)*, and the severance of U.S. multinational support in all host countries' governmental affairs (1974–1976)*. As United Fruit battles with Honduran oppositions, they also fight similar battles with the other host Central American nations, let alone their own Great Depression and the rising threat of communism.

Labor unionization
From 1900 to 1945, the power and economic hegemony allotted to the American multinational corporations by host countries was designed to bring nations such as Honduras out of foreign debt and economic turmoil all the while decreasing the expenses of production, increasing the levels of efficiency and profit, and thriving in a tariff-free economic system. However, the growing demand for bananas surpassed the supply because of challenges such as invasive fruit diseases (Panama, sigtaoka, and moko) plus human illnesses from extreme working conditions (chemical toxicity and communicable diseases).

Laborers began to organize, protest, and expose the conditions in what they were suffering from at the location of their division. Small-scale fruit producers would also join the opposition to regain equality in the market economy and push for the redistribution of the taken communal lands sold to American multinational corporations. Referencing to the Honduran administrations from 1945 to 1954, business historian Marcelo Bucheli interpreted their acts of collusion and stated "The dictators helped United Fruit's business by creating a system with little or no social reform, and in return United Fruit helped them remain in power". As the rise of dictatorship flourished under Tiburcio Carías Andino's national administration (1933–1949) and prevailed for 16 years until it was passed onto nationalist President Juan Manuel Gálvez (a former lawyer for the United Fruit Company).

The General Strike of 1954 in Tela, Honduras was largest organized labor opposition against the United Fruit company. However, it did involve the laborers from United Fruit, Standard Fruit, along with industrial workers from San Pedro Sula. Honduran laborers were demanding fair pay, economic rights, checked national authority, and eradication of imperialist capitalism. The total number of protesters was estimated at greater than 40,000. On the 69th day, an agreement was made between United Fruit and the mass of protesters leading to the end of the General Strike. Under the administration of Galvez (1949–1954) strides were taken to put into effect the negotiated improvements of workers rights. Honduran laborers gained the right for shorter work days, paid holidays, limited employee responsibility for injuries, the improvement of employment regulation over women and children, and the legalization of unionization. In the summer of 1954 the strike ended, yet the demand for economic nationalism and social reform was just beginning to gain even more momentum going into the 1960s–1970s.

Nationalist movement

By legalizing unionization, the large mass of laborers were able to organize and act on the influences of nationalist movement, communist ideology, and becomes allies of the communist party. As like in the neighboring nation of Cuba and the rise communism led by Fidel Castro, the fight for nationalism spread to other Latin American nations and ultimately led to a regional revolution. Aid was given to these oppressed Latin American nations by the Communist Party of the Soviet Union. Americans struggled to maintain control and protect their capital investment while building tensions grew between America, the communist, and nationalist parties.

The 1970s energy crisis was a period where petroleum production reached its peak, causing an inflation in price, leading to petroleum shortages, and a 10-year economic battle. Ultimately the United Fruit Company, among other multinational fruit enterprises, would attempt to recover capital lost due to the oil crisis through the Latin American nations. The United Fruit's plan for recovery would ensue by increasing taxation and reestablishing exclusivity contracts with small-scale farmers."The crisis forced local governments to realign themselves and follow protectionist policies" (Bulmer-Thomas, 1987). The fight to not lose their control over Honduras and other sister host nations to communism failed, yet the nature of their relationship did change to where the national government had the higher authority and control.

End of the Honduran banana republic era
At the end of the 1970s energy crisis, Honduras was under the administration of Oswaldo Lopez Arellano after he seized control from President Ramon Villeda Morales. Trying to redistribute the taken lands of Honduras, President Arellano attempted to aid the Honduran people in regaining their economic independence but was stopped by President Ramón Ernesto Cruz Uclés in 1971. In 1960, the Organisation of the Petroleum Exporting Countries (OPEC) was created and did not involve Costa Rica, Guatemala, Honduras, Panama, and Colombia. Designed to strengthen the same nations that experienced extreme economic turmoil, the authority and control of foreign multinational companies, 1970s energy crisis, and the inflation of trade tariffs. Through nullification of the concession contracts originally granted to the U.S. multinational companies, Latin American countries were able to further their plan for progress but were met with hostility from the U.S. companies. Later in 1974, President Arellano approved a new agrarian reform granting thousands of acres of expropriated lands from the United Fruit Company back to Honduran people. The worsened relations between the U.S. and the newly affirmed powers of the Latin American countries would bring all parties into the 1974 banana War.

Aiding and abetting a terrorist organization

In March 2007 Chiquita Brands pleaded guilty in a United States Federal court to aiding and abetting a terrorist organization, when it admitted to the payment of more than $1.7 million to the United Self-Defense Forces of Colombia (AUC), a group that the United States has labeled a terrorist organization since 2001. Under a plea agreement, Chiquita Brands agreed to pay $25 million in restitution and damages to the families of victims of the AUC. The AUC had been paid to protect the company's interest in the region.

In addition to monetary payments, Chiquita has also been accused of smuggling weapons (3,000 AK-47s) to the AUC and in assisting the AUC in smuggling drugs to Europe. Chiquita Brands admitted that they paid AUC operatives to silence union organizers and intimidate farmers into selling only to Chiquita. In the plea agreement, the Colombian government let Chiquita Brands keep the names of U.S. Citizens who brokered this agreement with the AUC secret, in exchange for relief to 390 families.

Despite calls from Colombian authorities and human rights organizations to extradite the U.S. citizens responsible for war crimes and aiding a terrorist organization, the U.S. Department of Justice has refused to grant the request, citing 'conflicts of law'. As with other high-profile cases involving wrongdoing by American companies abroad, the U.S. State Department and the U.S. Department of Justice are very careful to hand over any American citizen to be tried under another country's legal system, so for the time being Chiquita Brands International avoided a catastrophic scandal, and instead walked away with a humiliating defeat in court and eight of its employees fired.

The Great White Fleet

For over a century, United Fruit Company steamships carried bananas and passengers between Caribbean and United States seaports. These fast ships were initially designed to transport bananas but later included cargo liners with accommodations for fifty to one hundred passengers. Cruises of two to four weeks were instrumental in establishing Caribbean tourism. These banana boats were painted white to keep the temperature of the bananas lower by reflecting the tropical sun:
Admiral Dewey, Admiral Schley, Admiral Sampson and Admiral Farragut (1899) were United States Navy vessels declared surplus after the Spanish–American War. Each carried 53 passengers and 35,000 bunches of bananas.
Venus (1903) United Fruit Company's first refrigerated banana ship
San Jose, Limon and Esparta (1904) first banana reefers built to United Fruit design. San Jose and Esparta were sunk by U-boats in World War II.
Atenas (1909) class of 13 5,000-ton banana reefers built in Ireland
  fruit carrier built by Workman, Clark & Company of Belfast, changed from British to United States registry 1914 when war broke out in Europe, served briefly as commissioned transport for U.S. Navy in World War I, and was again in service for World War II under U.S. Army charter then as War Shipping Administration transport. Torpedoed and sunk October 21, 1943 by German aircraft off Algeria in Convoy MKS-28.
Carrillo and Sixaola, sister ships of Tivives, both 1911, both U.S. Navy in WW I. Carrillo as ID-1406  and Sixaola as ID-2777/4524. Both in WW II as United Fruit operated vessels for the War Shipping Administration. Carrillo survived to be scrapped 1948. Sixaola was torpedoed and sunk 12 June 1942. 
Pastores (1912) 7241-ton cruise liner became 
Calamares (1913) 7,622-ton banana reefer became 
Toloa (1917) 6,494-ton banana reefer
Ulua (1917) 6,494-ton banana reefer became 
San Benito (1921) 3,724-ton turbo-electric banana reefer became 
Mayari and Choluteca (1921) 3,724-ton banana reefers
La Playa (1923) banana reefer
La Marea (1924) 3,689-ton diesel-electric banana reefer became  4,281-ton turbo-electric banana reefer in about 1929–31
Telda, Iriona, Castilla and Tela (1927) banana reefers
Aztec (1929) banana reefer
Talamanca (1931) 6,963-ton turbo-electric passenger and cargo liner became 
Jamaica (1931) 6,968-ton turbo-electric passenger and cargo liner became 
Chiriqui (1931) 6,963-ton turbo-electric passenger and cargo liner became 
 (1931) 6,982-ton Turbo-electric passenger and cargo liner providing two-week cruises of Cuba, Jamaica, Colombia, Honduras and the Panama Canal Zone.
Quirigua (1932) 6,982-ton turbo-electric passenger and cargo liner became 
Veraqua (1932) 6,982-ton turbo-electric passenger and cargo liner became 
Oratava (1936) banana reefer
Comayagua, Junior, Metapan, Yaque and Fra Berlanga (1946) banana reefers
Manaqui (1946) bulk sugar ship

See also 
Lancetilla Botanical Garden

References

Sources

Further reading

 Martin, James E. (2018). Banana Cowboys: The United Fruit Company and the Culture of Corporate Colonialism. Albuquerque, NM: University of New Mexico Press, 2018.
 Revised edition of An American Company (1976).

 "La United Fruit Co."

External links

United Fruit Historical Society
"Our Complex History", from the Chiquita Brands International 2000 Corporate Responsibility Report (via Archives.org)
United Fruit Company Photograph Collection, 1891–1962
Chiquita Banana Protest Information on the company's corruption
From Arbenz to Zelaya: Chiquita in Latin America – video report by Democracy Now!
United Fruit Company Photograph Collection at Baker Library Historical Collections, Harvard Business School
United Fruit Company Photographs at the University of South Florida
United Fruit Company archival papers at the University of Toronto Mississauga Library, Archives & Special Collections
Banana-Express Animadoc about interactions between United Fruit Company's railroad in Costa Rica and the country development
The Fleets—United Fruit Company (TheShipsList)
LIFE Magazine article, Feb. 19, 1951

 
Banana Wars
Defunct agriculture companies of the United States
Defunct shipping companies of the United States
Guatemalan Revolution
History of Colombia
History of Costa Rica
History of Guatemala
History of Honduras
History of Panama
American companies established in 1899
American companies disestablished in 1970
Agriculture companies established in the 19th century
Agriculture companies disestablished in the 20th century

ja:ユナイテッド・フルーツ